Martina Babková (born 31 August 1950) is a Czech basketball player. She competed in the women's tournament at the 1976 Summer Olympics.

References

External links
 

1950 births
Living people
Czech women's basketball players
Olympic basketball players of Czechoslovakia
Basketball players at the 1976 Summer Olympics
People from Děčín
Sportspeople from the Ústí nad Labem Region